The Secret is the fifth solo album by English rock musician Alan Parsons. It was released on 26 April 2019 via Frontiers. Guest appearances include guitarist Steve Hackett on the first track, Jason Mraz singing on "Miracle", and Lou Gramm singing on "Sometimes".

Track listing

Adapted from Blabbermouth.net.

Personnel

Lead vocals: Jason Mraz, Lou Gramm, Alan Parsons, Todd Cooper, P. J. Olsson, Jordan Asher Huffman, Jared Mahone, Mark Mikel
Additional vocals: Alan Parsons, Todd Cooper, Dan Tracey, Jordan Asher Huffman, P. J. Olsson, Carl–Magnus "C-M" Carlsson, Andy Ellis, Doug Powell
Narration: Alan Parsons
Guitars: Steve Hackett, Jeff Kollman, Dan Tracey, Tony Rosacci, Ian Bairnson, Alan Parsons
Synth, keyboards: Andy Ellis, Tom Brooks, Dan Tracey, Alan Parsons
Piano: Pat Caddick, Angelo Pizzaro, Tom Brooks
Bass: Nathan East, Guy Erez, Jeff Peterson
Drums: Vinnie Colaiuta, Danny Thompson, Carl Sorensen
Saxophone: Todd Cooper
Orchestra: The CMG Music Recording Orchestra of Hollywood
Orchestral arrangements: Tom Brooks, Dan Tracey, Milton Olsson 
Orchestra conductors: Tom Brooks, Alan Parsons
Cello: Michael Fitzpatrick
Percussion: Alan Parsons, Todd Cooper
Ukulele: Jake Shimabukuro
Trombones: Oscar Utterström
Trumpets: Vinnie Ciesielski
Recording engineers: Noah Bruskin, Alan Parsons, Grant Goddard 
Mixing engineers: Alan Parsons, Noah Bruskin
Assistant engineers: Jeff Fitzpatrick
Additional engineering: Tre Nagella, Dave Albro, Andy Ellis
Mastering engineer: Dave Donnelly
Producer: Alan Parsons

Charts

References

2019 albums
Alan Parsons albums
Albums produced by Alan Parsons
Frontiers Records albums